Ohad Knoller (born 28 September 1976) is an Israeli actor. He had roles in the Eytan Fox films Yossi & Jagger and The Bubble, and the Steven Spielberg film Munich.

Background
Knoller was born in Tel Aviv, Israel, to a Jewish family. He is the son of journalist Judith Knoller. Knoller served in as a soldier in the Combat Engineering Corps of the Israel Defense Forces.
He was married until 2011 to actress Noa Raban, with whom he has a son.Knoller attended the Thelma Yellin high school for performing arts in Tel Aviv. In 1990, when he was 14, he starred in his first TV role on Israeli television. At the age of 18, in 1994, he played a role in the movie Under the Domim Tree with Gila Almagor. After his military service he began to study acting at the Nissan Nativ school of acting in Tel Aviv.

His theatre experience at the Jerusalem Khan Theatre included roles including the lead in "The Miser". He also appeared in the movie Super Boy (1998).

In 2008-2012, he starred in the television series Srugim as Doctor Nati Brenner.

Filmography
1994: Under the Domim Tree - Yurek
2002: Yossi & Jagger - Yossi
2003: Knafayim (TV Mini-Series) - Ido Geva
2004: Year Zero - Bank Clerk
2004: Delusions - Avi
2004: Love Hurts (TV Series) - Eddy
2005: Bruno's in Love (TV Movie) - Asaf Bruno
2005: Munich - Commando
2006: The Bubble - Noam
2007: Beaufort - Lieutenant Ziv Faran, bomb disposal officer
2007: Redacted - Army Psychiatrist
2008: Til the Wedding (TV Series) - Nimrod Maliniak
2008: Srugim (TV Series) - Nati Brenner, MD
2008: Ha'yom Shel Adam (Short) - Yoav
2008: Halakeh - Yoni
2010: Who do you think you are? (TV Mini-Series)
2011: Barefoot (TV Mini-Series)
2011: Anachnu Lo Levad - Eddy
2012: Yossi - Yossi
2012: Urban Tale - Man in jail cell
2015: A Tale of Love and Darkness - Israel Zarchi
2017: Bayit Bagalil2017: McMafia (TV Series) - Yariv Ableman
2018: Operation Finale - Ephraim Ilani
2019: The Operative - Stefan
2020: Valley of Tears - general

Awards
In 2003, Knoller won the Tribeca Award as best male actor for his role in Yossi & Jagger.

References

Living people
1976 births
Israeli male child actors
Israeli male stage actors
Israeli male television actors
Israeli male film actors
Thelma Yellin High School of Arts alumni
Male actors from Tel Aviv
Israeli Jews